Thurmond is a surname.

Notable people with the name include:

Aretha Thurmond (born 1976), American discus thrower
Chris Thurmond (born c. 1951), American football coach
J. M. Thurmond (1836–1882), mayor of Dallas, Texas from 1879–1880
James Strom Thurmond Jr. (born 1972), American politician, son of Strom Thurmond
Mark Thurmond (born 1956), American baseball pitcher
Mike Thurmond (born 1953), American school district superintendent and politician
Nate Thurmond (1941–2016), American basketball player
Paul Thurmond (born 1976), American politician, son of Strom Thurmond
Sarah Thurmond 18th-century English actress
Strom Thurmond (1902–2003), American senator
Walter Thurmond (born 1987), American football player who plays cornerback in the National Football League

See also
Thurmond House (disambiguation)
Thurman (disambiguation)